Cassinia denticulata, commonly known as stiff cassinia, is a species of flowering plant in the family Asteraceae and is endemic to eastern New South Wales. It is a shrub with yellowish stems, finely-toothed, egg-shaped to elliptic leaves, and heads of pale yellow flowers arranged in a dense corymb.

Description
The upper surface of the leaves is glossy dark green and sticky, the lower surface paler and covered with sticky hairs. The heads are arranged in a dense corymb of florets.

Taxonomy and naming
Cassinia denticulata was first formally described in 1818 by Robert Brown in Transactions of the Linnean Society of London. The specific epithet means "finely toothed".

Distribution and habitat
Stiff cassinia grows in heath and woodland on sandstone and sandy soils, mainly from the Hawkesbury River to Fitzroy Falls including the Sydney area and the Blue Mountains.

References

denticulata
Asterales of Australia
Flora of New South Wales
Taxa named by Robert Brown (botanist, born 1773)
Plants described in 1818